Hanson Clarinet Company is a manufacturer of woodwind instruments. The company is noted for their clarinets which are made in their workshops in Marsden, West Yorkshire. The company is the largest manufacturer of clarinets in the United Kingdom.

In May 2010, Hanson Clarinet were awarded the world’s first Forest Stewardship Council (FSC) Chain of Custody (CoC) certificate for using African Blackwood in its products. Hanson Clarinets launched the world’s first FSC-certified clarinets by late 2010. The FSC-certified wood is harvested in Tanzania.

References

External links
 

Clarinet manufacturing companies
Musical instrument manufacturing companies of the United Kingdom
Companies based in Kirklees